In folklore, a mermaid is an aquatic creature with the head and upper body of a female human and the tail of a fish. Mermaids appear in the folklore of many cultures worldwide, including Europe, Asia, and Africa.

Mermaids are sometimes associated with perilous events such as floods, storms, shipwrecks, and drownings. In other folk traditions (or sometimes within the same traditions), they can be benevolent or beneficent, bestowing boons or falling in love with humans.

The male equivalent of the mermaid is the merman, also a familiar figure in folklore and heraldry. Although traditions about and sightings of mermen are less common than those of mermaids, they are generally assumed to co-exist with their female counterparts. The male and the female collectively are sometimes referred to as merfolk or merpeople.

The Western concept of mermaids as beautiful, seductive singers may have been influenced by the Sirens of Greek mythology, which were originally half-birdlike, but came to be pictured as half-fishlike in the Christian era. Historical accounts of mermaids, such as those reported by Christopher Columbus during his exploration of the Caribbean, may have been sightings of manatees or similar aquatic mammals. While there is no evidence that mermaids exist outside folklore, reports of mermaid sightings continue to the present day.

Mermaids have been a popular subject of art and literature in recent centuries, such as in Hans Christian Andersen's literary fairy tale "The Little Mermaid" (1836). They have subsequently been depicted in operas, paintings, books, comics, animation, and live-action films.

Etymologies 

The English word "mermaid" is not very old, with the earliest attestation in Middle English (Chaucer, Nun's Priest's Tale, c. 1390). The compound word is formed from  "" (sea), and "".

Mermin 

Another English word "†mermin" ( in the OED) for 'siren or mermaid' is older, though now obsolete. It derives from Old English , ad.  'sea' +  'female slave', earliest attestation , as a gloss for  "siren", in Corpus Glossary (c. 725).

Middle English example  in a bestiary (c. 1220?; MS. now dated to 1275–1300) is indeed 'mermaid', part maiden, part fish-like.

Its Old High German cognate  is known from biblical glosses and Physiologus.

The Middle High German cognate , (mod.

Old Norse , masculine noun, is also listed as cognate to "†mermin", as well as ON , modern Icelandic , and modern Norwegian marmæle.

Merewif 
Old English  is another related term, and appears once in reference not so much to a mermaid but a certain sea hag, and not well-attested later.

Its MHG cognate , also defined as "" in modern German with perhaps "" a valid English definition. The word is attested, among other medieval epics, in the Nibelungenlied, and rendered "merwoman",, "mermaid", "water sprite", or other terms; the two in the story are translated as ON  ("sea-women").

Origins 
The siren of Ancient Greek mythology became conflated with mermaids during the medieval period. Some European Romance languages  still use cognate terms for siren to denote the mermaid, e.g., French  and Spanish and Italian .

Some commentators have sought to trace origins further back into § Ancient Middle Eastern mythology.

Sirens 

In the early Greek period, the sirens were conceived of as human-headed birds, but by the classical period, the Greeks sporadically depicted the siren as part fish in art.

Medieval sirens as mermaids 

The siren's part-fish appearance became increasingly popular during the Middle Ages. And the traits of the classical sirens, such as using their beautiful song as a lure as told by Homer, has often been transferred to mermaids.

These change of the medieval siren from bird to fish were thought by some to be the influence of Teutonic myth, later expounded in literary legends of Lorelei and Undine; though a dissenting comment is that parallels are not limited to Teutonic culture.

Textual attestations 

The earliest text describing the siren as fish-tailed occurs in the Liber Monstrorum de diversis generibus (7th–mid 8th cent.), which described sirens as "sea girls" whose beauty in form and sweet song allure seafarers, but beneath the human head and torso, have the scaly tail-end of a fish with which they can navigate the sea.

"Sirens are mermaids" (Old High German/Early ) is explicit in the aforementioned Old German Physiologus (11th century).

The Middle English bestiary (mid-13th century) clearly means "mermaid" when it explains the siren to be a mereman, stating that she has a body and breast like that of a maiden but joined, at the navel, by a body part which is definitely fish, with fins growing out of her.

Old French verse bestiaries (e.g. Philipp de Thaun's version, written c. 1121–1139) also accommodated by stating that a part of the siren may be bird or fish.

Iconographic attestations 
In a 9th century Physiologus manufactured in France (Fig., top left), the siren was illustrated as a "woman-fish", i.e., mermaid-like, despite being described as bird-like in the text.

The Bodleian bestiary dated 1220–12 also pictures a group of fish-tailed mermaid-like sirens (Fig. bottom), contradicting its text which likens it to a winged fowl down to their feet.

In the interim, the siren as pure mermaid was becoming commonplace, particularly in the so-called "Second Family" Latin bestiaries, as represented in one of the early manuscripts classified into this group (Additional manuscript 11283, c. 1170–1180s. Fig., top right).

(Mirror and comb)

While the siren holding a fish was a commonplace theme, the siren in bestiaries were also sometimes depicted holding the comb, or the mirror.

The comb and mirror became an persistent symbol of the siren-mermaid.

In the Christian moralizing context (e.g the bestiaries), the mermaid's mirror and comb were held as the symbol of vanity.

Other Greek mythical figures 
The sea-monsters Scylla and Charybdis, who lived near the sirens, were also female and had some fishlike attributes. Though Scylla's violence is contrasted with the sirens' seductive ways by certain classical writers, Scylla and Charybdis lived near the sirens' domain. In Etruscan civilization before the 6th century BC, Scylla was portrayed as a mermaid-like creature with two tails. Some have argued that the two-tailed Melusine of later European art is traceable to this Etruscan Scylla. A sporadic example of sirens as mermaids (tritonesses) in Early Greek art (3rd century BC), can be explained as the contamination of the siren myth with Scylla and Charybdis.

The female oceanids, nereids and naiads are mythical water nymphs or deities, although not depicted with fish tails. "Nereid" and "nymph" have also been applied to actual mermaid-like marine creatures purported to exist, from Pliny (cf. §Roman Lusitania and Gaul) and onwards. Jane Ellen Harrison (1882) has speculated that the mermaids or tritonesses of Greek and Roman mythology may have been brought from the Middle East, possibly transmitted by Phoenician mariners.

The Greek god Triton had two fish tails instead of legs, and later became pluralized as a group. The prophetic sea deity Glaucus was also depicted with a fish tail and sometimes with fins for arms.

Ancient Middle Eastern mythology

Kulullû 
Depictions of entities with the upper bodies of humans and the tails of fish appear in Mesopotamian artwork from the Old Babylonian Period onwards, on cylinder seals. These figures are usually mermen (kulullû), but mermaids do occasionally appear. The name for the mermaid figure may have been *kuliltu, meaning "fish-woman". Such figures were used in Neo-Assyrian art as protective figures and were shown in both monumental sculpture and in small, protective figurines.

Syrian mermaid goddess 

A mermaid-like goddess, identified by Greek and Roman writers as Derceto or Atargatis, was worshipped at Ashkelon. In a myth recounted by Diodorus in the 1st century BCE, Derceto gave birth to a child from an affair. Ashamed, she abandoned the child in the desert and drowned herself in a lake, only to be transformed into a human-headed fish. The child, Semiramis, was fed by doves and survived to become a queen.

In the 2nd century AD, Lucian described seeing a Phoenician statue of Derceto with the upper body of a woman and the tail of a fish. He noted the contrast with the grand statue located at her Holy City (Hierapolis Bambyce), which appeared entirely human.

In the myth, Semiramis's first husband is named Onnes. Some scholars have compared this to the earlier Mesopotamian myth of Oannes, one of the apkallu or seven sages described as fish-men in cuneiform texts. While Oannes was a servant of the water deity Ea, having gained wisdom from the god, English writer Arthur Waugh understood Oannes to be equivalent to Ea, and proposed that surely "Oannes had a fish-tailed wife" and descendants, with Atargatis being one deity thus descended, "through the mists of time".

Diodorus's chronology of Queen Semiramis resembles the feats of Alexander the Great (campaigns to India, etc.), and Diodorus may have woven the Macedonian king's material via some unnamed source. There is a mermaid legend attached to Alexander the Great's sister, but this is of post-medieval vintage (see below).

Rational attempts at explanation 

Sometime before 546 BC, Milesian philosopher Anaximander postulated that mankind had sprung from an aquatic animal species, a theory that is sometimes called the Aquatic Ape Theory. He thought that humans, who begin life with prolonged infancy, could not have survived otherwise.

There are also naturalist theories on the origins of the mermaid, postulating they derive from sightings of manatees, dugongs or even seals.

Still another theory, tangentially related to the aforementioned Aquatic Ape Theory, is that the mermaids of folklore were actually human women who trained over time to be skilled divers for things like sponges, and spent a lot of time in the sea as a result. One proponent of this theory is British author William Bond, who has written several books about it.

Medieval literature

Merwomen in Germanic literature

Nibelungenlied 
Two prophetic merwomen, Sigelinde (MHG: Sigelint) and her maternal aunt Hadeburg (MHG: Hadeburc) are bathing in the Danube River when Hagen von Tronje encounters them (Nibelungenlied, Âventiure 25).

They are called sjókonar ("sea woman") in the Old Norse Þiđreks saga. There is a swan maiden tale motif involved here (Hagen robs their clothing), but Grimm thought they must have actually been swan maidens, since they are described as hovering above water.

In any case, this brief segment became the "foundational" groundwork of subsequent water-nix lore and literature that developed in the Germanic sphere.

They are a probable source of the three Rhine maidens in Richard Wagner's opera Das Rheingold. Though conceived of as swan-maidens in Wagner's 1848 scenario, the number being a threesome was suggested by the woodcut by Julius Schnorr von Carolsfeld and Eugen Napoleon Neureuther in the Pfizer edition of 1843 (fig. on the left).

Rabenschlacht 

Middle High German mereminne 'mermaid'  is mentioned, among other epics, in the Rabenschlacht ("Battle of Ravenna", 13th cent.) of the Dietrich cycle. The mermaid (or ) is named Wâchilt and is the ancestress of the traitorous Wittich who carries him off at the time of peril to her "submarine home".

This material has been found translated as a medieval Þiðreks saga only in a late, reworked Swedish version, i.e., one of the closing chapters of Ðiðriks saga (15th century, also known as the "Swedish epilogue".). The mermaid/undine is here translated as Old Swedish .

The genealogy is given in the saga: the sea-woman and Villcinus (Vilkinus), king of Scandinavia together had a son, Vaði (Wade) of (Sjóland=Sjælland, Zealand) who was a giant; whose son was Velent (Wayland the Smith), whose son after that was Viðga Velentsson (Wittich or Witige),  who became a companion/champion of King Þiðrekr (Dietrich von Bern).

The frequently mentioned Sjælland, Denmark is interpreted to the divided portion of Villcina-land inherited by the bastard prince Vaði/Wade. The Swedish epilogue transposed the location of the crucial battle where the mermaid appeared, from Ravenna, Northern Italy (supposedly, in the original German epic Rabenschlacht), to Gronsport, somewhere on the Moselle, in Northern Germany, then transported Viðga back to Sjælland.

Folklore of the British Isles 
The Norman chapel in Durham Castle, built around 1078, has what is probably the earliest surviving artistic depiction of a mermaid in England. It can be seen on a south-facing capital above one of the original Norman stone pillars.

Mermaids appear in British folklore as unlucky omens, both foretelling disaster and provoking it. Several variants of the ballad Sir Patrick Spens depict a mermaid speaking to the doomed ships. In some versions, she tells them they will never see land again; in others, she claims they are near shore, which they are wise enough to know means the same thing.

In another short ballad, "Clerk Colvill" (Child ballad No. 42), the mermaid seduces the title character and foretells his doom. It has been surmised that in the original complete version, the man was being penalized for spurning her, though the Scandinavian counterparts that tells the complete story feature an elf-woman or elf queen rather than mermaid.

Mermaids have been described as able to swim up rivers to freshwater lakes. In one story, the Laird of Lorntie went to aid a woman he thought was drowning in a lake near his house; his servant pulled him back, warning that it was a mermaid, and the mermaid screamed at them that she would have killed him if it were not for his servant. But mermaids could occasionally be more beneficent; e.g., teaching humans cures for certain diseases. Mermen have been described as wilder and uglier than mermaids, with little interest in humans.

According to legend a mermaid came to the Cornish village of Zennor, where she used to listen to the singing of a chorister, Matthew Trewhella. The two fell in love, and Matthew went with the mermaid to her home at Pendour Cove. On summer nights, the lovers can be heard singing together. The legend, recorded by folklorist William Bottrell, stems from a 15th-century mermaid carving on a wooden bench at the Church of Saint Senara in Zennor.

Some tales raised the question of whether mermaids had immortal souls, answering in the negative.

In Scottish mythology, a ceasg is a freshwater mermaid, though little beside the term has been preserved in folklore.

Mermaids from the Isle of Man, known as ben-varrey, are considered more favorable toward humans than those of other regions, with various accounts of assistance, gifts and rewards. One story tells of a fisherman who carried a stranded mermaid back into the sea and was rewarded with the location of treasure. Another recounts the tale of a baby mermaid who stole a doll from a human little girl, but was rebuked by her mother and sent back to the girl with a gift of a pearl necklace to atone for the theft. A third story tells of a fishing family that made regular gifts of apples to a mermaid and was rewarded with prosperity.

In Irish lore, Lí Ban was a human being transformed into a mermaid. After three centuries, when Christianity came to Ireland, she was baptized. The Irish mermaid is called merrow in tales such as "Lady of Gollerus" published in the 19th century.

Scandinavian folklore

Haffrue 
The mermaid corresponds to Danish and Bokmål Norwegian , whereas merman answers to Danish/Norwegian havmand.{{Refn|group="lower-alpha"|Tracing this etymologically to Old Norse is elusive. Old Swedish haffru was used as a tanslation word in the Sweidish saga of Didrik (14 cent.) as mentioned under §Etymologies. A supposed Old Norse haffrú is the etymological source of Norman  French havette for a man-snatching water-sprite, according to one linguist.

As a side-note, Norman French havette is a possible derivative.{{Refn|group="lower-alpha"|The initial "h" is an aspirated h here could very well be pronounced, even in modern Normandy, especially for words borrowed from the Germanic, as Gorog points out elsewhere. Wartburg (Gorog  tr.) glosses navette" as "sort of water-sprite (ondine) which attracts passers-by at night.. and plunges in with them", adding that in the patois of Valognes, it is used as a bugbear to frighten children from approaching water.}}

An early description of the Havfrue, and her mate Havmand, was given by the Dano-Norwegian Bishop Pontoppidan (1753). They were considered the mating female and male of the creature, inhabiting the North Sea, and their offspring was called  (var. ), as repeated by later commentators.

Though he was aware of fabulous fables being told about them, he was convinced such creature existed. But as they were non-human, he argued the term  Havmand (merman) should be avoided, in favor of some coined term such as sea-ape. He also knowingly employed Old Norwegian/Old Norse maryge [sic.] and hafstrambe [sic.] as the Norwegian names of the mermaid and merman respectively.

 Havfrue cognates 

 Other aliases 

The terms margýgur or havgýgur as aliases for mermaid were apparently current among the populace in modern-age Iceland, according to Jón Árnason alongside the marbendill (modern Icelandic for ON marmennill)

Benjamin Thorpe (1851) writing on  Norwegian folklore gave margygr for mermaid (and marmennill for merman) as Norwegian folk terms, but these are interpolations, which the source, Andreas Faye's Norske sagn (1833), only side-noted as occurrences of old terms in medieval literature.

 General characteristics 
The beautiful havfrue of Scandinavia may be benevolent or malicious, and legends about her abducting maidens (cf. infra) is given as a case of point for her malice.

It is said the  havfrue will avenge harm done to it, as in the Norwegian anecdote of one who was lured near the ship, and had her hand cruelly lopped off on the gunwale. She caused a storm that nearly drowned the wicked sailor.

 Omen, prophecy and wisdom 

The appearance/sighting alone betides an impending storm. Norwegians do not wish to see the havfrue, as she heralds storm or bad weather (Norway). The appearance of the sjörå forebodes a storm or poor catch in Swedish tradition, much as the appearance of the skogsrå (wood-nymph) presages poor catch for the hunter. According to the superstitions of Swedish fishermen, if one saw a sjörå　who was harbinger of tempest and bad catch, one should not tell his comrades but stike flint against steel to light a spark.

In other cases the Scandinavian mermaid is considered to be prophetic.

This may not necessarily involve the mermaid's spaeing, and in the following example of this ML type tale, she merely imparts wisdom: A fisherman who performs favors and earns the privilege to pose three questions to a mermaid. He inquires about the most suitable material for a flail, to which she answers calf's hide, of course, and tells him he should have asked about how to brew water (into beer), which would have benefited him more greatly.

 Merfolk as abductors 

The Swedish ballad "Hafsfrun" (≈, SMB 23, TSB A 51) is an instance where a mermaid kidnaps a human girl at age fifteen, and when the girl's brother accomplishes the rescue, the mermaid declares she would have cracked her neck if she knew she would be thus betrayed. The Swedish merman Hafsman[nen] steals a human woman to become his bride according to folklore.

 Marmaele 
As aforementioned, the mermaid takes the merman for husband, and produce children called marmæler (sing. , "sea-talkers"). which the fishermen sometimes bring home to gain insight into the future.

Early sources say that Norwegian fishermen who capture the marmæte or marmæle may bring them home but do not dare keep it for more than 24 hours before turning them back into the sea whence they found it.

 Margýgr 
Jón Árnason describes the margýgur as yellow-haired woman who is fish from the waist down, who drags careless seamen to the depths of the sea.

However, margygr literally means something like "mer-troll", and in medieval tradition, the margygr is more of a "sea monster" or "sea-ogress".

According to a version of the Saga of St. Olaf (Olaf II of Norway) the king encountered a margygr whose singing lulled voyagers to sleep causing them to drown and whose high-pitched shrieks drove men insane. Her physical appearance is described thus: "She has a head like a horse, with ears erect and distended nostrils, big green eyes and fearful jaws. She has shoulders like a horse and hands in front; but behind she resembles a serpent". This margygr was also said to be furry like a seal, and gray-colored.

 Western European folklore 

Melusine is a mermaid-like character from European folklore, cursed to take the form of a serpent from the waist down. Later depictions sometimes changed this to a fish tail, and in heraldry her name was sometimes used for a mermaid with two tails.

The alchemist Paracelsus's treatise A Book on Nymphs, Sylphs, Pygmies, and Salamanders, and on the Other Spirits (1566) spawned the idea that the water elemental (or water sprite) could acquire an immortal soul through marriage with a human; this led to the writing of De la Motte Fouqué's novella Undine, and eventually to the famous literary mermaid tale, Hans Christian Andersen's fairy tale, "The Little Mermaid".

During the Romanesque period, mermaids were often associated with lust.Teodolinda Barolini, La Commedia senza Dio: Dante e la creazione di una realtà, 2003, p.150

 Byzantine and Ottoman Greek folklore 
The conception of the siren as both a mermaid-like creature and part bird-like persisted in Byzantine Greece for some time. The Physiologus began switching the illustration of the siren as that a mermaid, as in a version dated to the 9th century. The 10th century Byzantine Greek dictionary Suda still favored the avian description.

There is a modern Greek legend that Alexander the Great's sister Thessalonike turned into a mermaid after her death, living in the Aegean. She would ask the sailors on any ship she encountered only one question: "Is King Alexander alive?",() to which the correct answer was: "He lives and reigns and conquers the world" (Greek: "Ζει και βασιλεύει και τον κόσμον κυριεύει"). This answer would please her, and she would accordingly calm the waters and bid the ship farewell. Any other answer would enrage her, and she would stir up a terrible storm, dooming the ship and every sailor on board. This legend derives from an Alexander romance entitled the Phylláda tou Megaléxandrou (Φυλλάδα του Μεγαλέξανδρου) dating to the Ottoman Greece period, first printed in 1680.

 Eastern Europe 

Rusalkas are the Slavic counterpart of the Greek sirens and naiads, often seducing sailors to their doom. The nature of rusalkas varies among folk traditions, but according to ethnologist D.K. Zelenin they all share a common element: they are the restless spirits of the unclean dead.  They are usually the ghosts of young women who died a violent or untimely death, either by murder or suicide, before their wedding, especially by drowning. Rusalkas are said to inhabit lakes and rivers. They appear as beautiful young women with long pale green hair and pale skin, suggesting a connection with floating weeds and days spent underwater in faint sunlight. They can be seen after dark, dancing together under the moon and calling out to young men by name, luring them to the water and drowning them. The characterization of rusalkas as both desirable and treacherous is prevalent in Russia, Ukraine and Belarus, and was emphasized by 19th-century Russian authors. The best-known of the great Czech nationalist composer Antonín Dvořák's operas is Rusalka.

In Sadko, an East Slavic epic, the title character—an adventurer, merchant, and gusli musician from Novgorod—lives for some time in the underwater court of the "Sea Tsar" and marries his daughter, Chernava, before finally returning home. The tale inspired such works as the poem Sadko by Alexei Tolstoy (1817–75), the opera Sadko composed by Nikolai Rimsky-Korsakov, and the painting Sadko by Ilya Repin.

 Chinese folklore 

Note that these are not of a specific gender, so they are not really conducive to being called "mermaids", though some English (European) writers might use "mermaid" as shorthand.

There is also an account of the ("sea human fish"), given in the Taiping guangji compilation, sourced from the work entitled Qiawenji. The female of its kind had a head like beautiful woman's, with hair like a horse's tail, and white skin like jade without scales, covered with multicolored downy hair (or peach fuzz), and legless. The male and female had sexual organs like humans, so that widows and  would keep them in their ponds, and the creatures could perform sexual intercourse normally as a human would.

An anecdote considered relevant concerns a renyu ("human fish") allegedly seen by the ship carrying Zha Dao, and emissary to Korea. She had a unkempt hairdo and scarlet mane extending to the back of her elbows. Zha ordered the crew to bring her aboard with poles, but she escaped. Zha explained that she was a renyu, adept at fornicating with humans, and was a type of human dwelling in the sea. The anecdote is included in another leishu compilation called Gujin tushu jicheng  ( "Comprehensive Compendium of Illustrations and Books, Ancient and Modern").

 Korean folklore 
Korea is bound on three sides by the sea. In some villages near the sea in Korea, there are mysterious stories about mermaids. Mermaids have features just like humans. Kim Dam Ryeong, a mayor of the town, saved four captured mermaids from a fisherman, as recorded in the Eou yadam (unofficial histories). In Dongabaek Island of Busan is a tale of Princess Hwang-ok from Naranda, a mythical undersea kingdom of mermaids; this tale is based on the historical Heo Hwang-ok from India. Another tale concerns a mermaid named Sinjike who warned fishermen of impending storms by singing and throwing rocks into the sea from Geomun Island. The island's residents believed her to be a goddess of the sea and that she could predict the weather.

 Japanese folklore 

According to one dictionary, ningyo oftentimes refers to a "half-woman and half-fish fabulous creature", i.e., mermaid, though not necessarily female, i.e., includes mermen.

Despite the dictionary stating it has the appearance of half-woman half-fish, the creature has been pictorialized rather as a being with a human female head sitting on a body which is entirely fish-like (see fig. right).

 Ningyo flesh 
The ningyos flesh was purported to be an elixir, and consuming its flesh said to bestow remarkable longevity.

A famous ningyo legend concerns the  who is said to have partaken of the flesh of a merfolk and attained miraculous longevity and lived for centuries. It is not discernible whether the flesh was a female; a pair of translators call it "flesh of a mermaid" in one book, but merely a "strange fish with a human face" in another.

 As yōkai 
A ningyo might be counted as a yōkai since it is included in Toriyama Sekien's Hyakki Yagyō series. Gender is unclear, as it is only described as a being with "a human face, a fish body". However, Sekien's ningyo picture actually represents a "human-fish" that lives in Western China, also known as the Di people , according to the inscription printed alongside. They are described in the Classic of Mountains and Seas and translated as the "Low People" or the "Di People".

 Indian folklore 

In Hinduism, Suvannamaccha (lit. golden mermaid) is a daughter of Ravana who appears in the Cambodian and Thai versions of the Ramayana. She is a mermaid princess who tries to spoil Hanuman's plans to build a bridge to Lanka, but falls in love with him instead. She is a popular figure in Thai folklore.

 Southeast Asia and Polynesia 
In Thailand, Suvannamaccha is a daughter of Tosakanth appearing in the Thai and other Southeast Asian versions of Ramayana. She is a mermaid princess who tries to spoil Hanuman's plans to build a bridge to Lanka but falls in love with him instead.

In Cambodia, she is referred as Sovanna Maccha, a favorite for Cambodian audiences.

 Indonesia 
In the Javanese culture of Indonesia, Nyai Roro Kidul is a sea goddess and the Queen of the Southern Seas; the mermaid queen is said to inhabit the southern beach in Java. She has many forms; in her mermaid form, she is called Nyai Blorong.

 Philippines 

In the Tagalog language mermaids are nown as sirena and siyokoy respectively. The general term for mermaid among all ethnic groups is Sirena.

In the Philippines, mermaid concepts differ per ethnic group. Among the Pangasinense, the Binalatongan mermaid is a Queen of the sea who married the mortal Maginoo Palasipas and ruled humanity for a time. Among the Ilocano, mermaids were said to have propagated and spread through the union of the first Serena and the first Litao, a water god. Among the Bicolano, mermaids were referred as Magindara, known for their beautiful voice and vicious nature. Among the Sambal, mermaids called Mambubuno are depicted as having two fins, instead of one.

 New Zealand 
Mermaids and mermen are also characters of   The myth of "Pania of the Reef", a well-known tale of Māori mythology, has many parallels with stories of sea-people in other parts of the world.

 African folklore 
Mami Water (Lit. "Mother of the Water") are water spirits venerated in West, Central and southern Africa, and in the African diaspora in the Caribbean and parts of North, Central and South America. They are usually female, but are sometimes male. They are regarded as diabolical beings, and are often femme fatales, luring men to their deaths. The Persian word "پری دریایی" or "maneli" means "mermaid".

In Zimbabwe mermaids are known as "njuzu". They are believed to be solitary and occupy one body of water. Individual njuzu may be benevolent or malicious. Angry njuzu may be blamed for unexpected misfortunes, such as bad weather or the sudden disappearance of people. Benevolent njuzu are thought to reside in peaceful lakes or rivers. If a person goes missing near such lakes or rivers, they may have been taken by the njuzu. To obtain the person's release, local elders will brew beer as a propitiatory offering, and ask the njuzu to return the person alive. Those seeking the person's release are not supposed to cry or shed tears. If the njuzu releases the person, they will become or be regarded as a n'anga, or traditional healer, with knowledge of herbs, medicinal plants, and cures.

Examples from other cultures are the jengu of Cameroon.

 Arabian folklore 

 One Thousand and One Nights 
The One Thousand and One Nights collection includes several tales featuring "sea people", such as "Jullanâr the Sea-born and Her Son King Badr Bâsim of Persia". Unlike depictions of mermaids in other mythologies, these are anatomically identical to land-bound humans, differing only in their ability to breathe and live underwater. They can (and do) interbreed with land humans, and the children of such unions have the ability to live underwater. In the tale "Abdullah the Fisherman and Abdullah the Merman", the protagonist Abdullah the Fisherman gains the ability to breathe underwater and discovers an underwater society that is portrayed as an inverted reflection of society on land.  The underwater society follows a form of primitive communism where concepts like money and clothing do not exist. In "The Adventures of Bulukiya", the protagonist Bulukiya's quest for the herb of immortality leads him to explore the seas, where he encounters societies of mermaids.

 American folklore 
The Neo-Taíno nations of the Caribbean identify a mermaid called Aycayia with attributes of the goddess Jagua and the hibiscus flower of the majagua tree Hibiscus tiliaceus. In modern Caribbean culture, there is a mermaid recognized as a Haitian vodou loa called La Sirene (lit. "the mermaid"), representing wealth, beauty and the orisha Yemaya.

 Iara and Ipupiara 
In Brazilian folklore, the iara, also known as mãe-d'agua ("lady/mother of the water") is a water-dwelling beauty whom fishermen are prone to fall prey to. "Iara is a beautiful white woman who lives in a river and seduces men as she sings with her hypnotizing and enchanting voice . Once the man is seduced he is drawn into the river to be gone forever". she is reputedly golden-haired, though the blond, blue-eyed image was not attested until after mid-19th century, to the best knowledge of Camara Cascudo. Cascudo in his earlier writing contended that though the Iara was rooted in two indigenous beings, the water-devil Ipupiara (cf. below) and the Cobra-Grande, he also saw the combining of the Portuguese lore of the Enchanted Moura (moorish girl), who was obviously dark-skinned. The Iara became increasingly to be regarded as a woman-fish, after the image of the European sirens/mermaids.

It is often argued that the legends of the Iara developed around the 18th century out of the indigenous myth of the  among the Tupinambá people. The Ipupiara was originally conceived of as a male water-dweller that carried fishermen to the bottom, devouring their mouths, nose, fingertips and genitals. Subsequently the Jesuit  wrote that the "Igpupiàra" also consisted of females that look like women with long hair. Though somewhat vague in the case of Gandavo, Cardim had clearly injected Christian opinion which would readily relegate the role of emasculating men to the female kind. Later with the introduction of African slaves, the Yoruba myth of Iemanjá was admixed into the telling.

 Reported sightings 

 Roman Lusitania and Gaul 
In his Natural History 9.4.9–11, Pliny the Elder, remarked that a triton (merman) was seen off the coast of Olisipo (present-day Lisbon, Portugal), and it bore the physical appearance in accordance with common notion of the triton, according to a deputation from Lisbon who reported it to Emperor Tiberus. One nereid was sighted earlier on the same (Lisbon) coast. Pliny remarks that contrary to popular notion, the true nereids are not smooth-skinned in their human-like portions, but covered with scales all over the body. Their mournful song at death have also been heard by the coastal inhabitants. Also, multiple nereids had washed up on the shore according to the legatus/governor of Gaul, who informed the late Emperor Augustus about it in a letter.

16th century Swedish writer Olaus Magnus quotes the same passage from Pliny, and further notes that the nereid are said to utter "dismal moans (wailings) at the hour of her death", thus observing a connection to the legend of sea-nymphs and the sister Fates whose clashing cymbals and flute tunes could be heard on shore. Olaus in a later passage states that the nereids (tr. "mermaids") are known to "sing plaintively", in general.

It has been conjectured that these carcasses of nereids washed up on shore were "presumably seals".

 Age of Exploration Americas and polar frontiers 
In 1493, sailing off the coast of Hispaniola, Christopher Columbus spotted three sirens or mermaids which he said were not as beautiful as they are represented, due to some masculine features in their faces, but these are considered to be sightings of manatees.

During Henry Hudson's second voyage on 15 June 1608, members of his crew reported sighting a mermaid in the Arctic Ocean, either in the Norwegian or Barents Seas.

Dutch explorer David Danell during his expeditions to Greenland in 1652–54 claimed to have spotted a mermaid with "flowing hair and very beautiful", though the crew failed to capture it.

 Colonial Brazil 

Danish physician and natural historian Thomas Bartholin wrote about a mermaid specimen caught in Brazil (probably a manatee ) and subsequently dissected at Leiden. Though referred to in the text as a  "sea-man" (homo marinus) from Brazil, the account was accompanied by an engraved drawing captioned "Sirene", whose appearance was that of a humanoid female with bared breasts (a mermaid). The specimen's body was deformed and "without the sign of a tail", matching the drawing. And "a membrane [that] join [the fingers] together" is also reflected in the drawing as well (as her webbed pair of hands/forepaws).

The specimen's account and illustration was later reproduced by Linnaeus, who captioned the beast "Siren Bartholini", hence "Bartholin's Siren".

Bartholin was actually not the sole proprietor of the specimen, but he came into possession of its hand and ribs, which he also illustrated in his book (figures above). Based on the illustration, the "hand" has been determined to be the front flipper belonging to a manatee by a team of researchers.

Bartholin himself had argued that it was a sea mammal closely related to seals (phocae). His rationale was that since there are several marine counterparts to land mammals e.g. "sea-horses", the possibility of a marine creature with striking likeness to humans could not be ruled out, though they should all be classified among seal-kind.

Erasmus Francisci (Erasmus Finx, 1668) associated this Brazilian specimen with the local native lore of the "Yupiapra" (Ipupiara).

 Colonial Southeast Asia 

 17th century Visayas 

A type of mermaid referred to as "anthropomorphus'" or "woman-fish" allegedly inhabited the Spanish-ruled Philippines, particularly in the waters around the Visayan Islands, according to contemporary writings from the 17th century.

The accounts are found in several books, on various topics from magnetism, to natural history, to ecclesiastical history.

These books refer to the mermaid/merman as "piscis anthropomorphos", and emphasize how human-like they appear in their upper bodies, as well as providing woodcut or etchings illustrating the male and female of the part-human part-fish creature.

Several of these sources mention the medical use of the woman-fish to control the flow of blood (or the four humours). It was effective for staunching the bleeding, i.e., effective against hemorrhages, according to Jonston. Other sources mention the ability to stop bleeding, e.g. Colín, who also thought that the Philippine woman-fish tasted like fatty pork. The bones were made into beads (i.e., strung together), as it was believed effective against s (of the humours).

 18th century Moluccas 

Allegedly captured in the Moluccas in the 17th century was the so-called "Amboina mermaid" (after the then Dutch Province of Ambon), which its leading researcher has referred to as Samuel Fallours's "Sirenne", after the man who came into possession of it and made an original painting of it in full color.

The painting was reproduced by Louis Renard on the "Fish" of the region, first published in 1719,

It was supposedly caught Boeren in Ambon Province (Buru, in present-day Maluku Province), presumably around the years 1706–1712, or perhaps the year 1712 precisely. During this period, Fallours served briefly as soldier for the VOC (Dutch East India Company) starting June 1706, but turned associate curate (Krankbezoeker) for the Dutch Reformed Church (September 1706 to June 1712).

Fallour's mermaid with additional details were described by François Valentijn in a 1726 book.

The mermaid was 59 Dutch inches long, or 5 feet in Rhineland measures. She reportedly survived 4 days 7 hours in a water tank, and died after refusing food it was given, having uttered no intelligible sound, or issuing sounds like screechings of a mouse. Something like a straw cape (Japanese mino) appears wrapped around her waist in the painting according to one commentator, but Fallours revealed in his notes that he lifted the front and back fins and "[found] it was shaped like a woman".

The mermaid was suspected to be a dugong in reality, even by contemporary scholars such as Georg Rumphius, although Valentijn was unable to believe they were the one and the same. Leading researcher Theodore W. Pietsch concurs with the dugong identification, but an ichthyologist has opined that "I could more easily accept a small oar-fish, or another eel-like fish, rather than a dugong as a partial basis for the drawing", noting that Renard's book carries an illustration of a plausibly realistic dugong as well.

 Qing dynasty China 
The Yuezhong jianwen ("Seens and Heards", or "Jottings on the South of China", 1730) contains two accounts concerning mermaids. In the first, a man captures a mermaid ( "sea woman") on the shore of Lantau Island. She looks human in every respect except that her body is covered with fine hair of many colors. She cannot talk, but he takes her home and marries her. After his death, the mermaid returns to the sea where she was found. In the second story, a man sees a woman lying on the beach while his ship was anchored offshore. On closer inspection, her feet and hands appear to be webbed. She is carried to the water, and expresses her gratitude toward the sailors before swimming away.

 U.S. and Canada 
Two sightings were reported in Canada near Vancouver and Victoria, one from sometime between 1870 and 1890, the other from 1967. A Pennsylvania fisherman reported five sightings of a mermaid in the Susquehanna River near Marietta in June 1881.

 21st century 

In August 2009, after dozens of people reported seeing a mermaid leaping out of Haifa Bay waters and doing aerial tricks, the Israeli coastal town of Kiryat Yam offered a $1 million award for proof of its existence.

In February 2012, work on two reservoirs near Gokwe and Mutare in Zimbabwe stopped when workers refused to continue, stating that mermaids had hounded them away from the sites. It was reported by Samuel Sipepa Nkomo, the water resources minister.

 Hoaxes and show exhibitions 

 Manufactured merfolk specimens 

A celebrated example of mermaid hoax was the Fiji mermaid exhibited in London in 1822 and later in America by P. T. Barnum in 1842, in this case an investigator claims to have traced the mermaid's manufacture to a Japanese fisherman.

Fake mermaids made in China and the Malay archipelago out of monkey and fish parts were imported into Europe by Dutch traders since the mid-16th century, and their manufactures are thought to go back earlier. The manufacture of mermaids from monkey and fish parts also occurred in Japan, especially in the Kyūshū region, as a souvenir industry targeting foreigners. Mōri Baien painted full color illustrations of such a compositely manufactured ningyo specimen in his ichthyological tract (1825). For much of the Edo Period, Nagasaki (in Kyūshū) was the only trade port open to foreign countries, and the only place where non-Japanese aliens could reside. Jan Cock Blomhoff, the Dutch East India Company director stationed in Dejima, Nagasaki is known to have acquired merfolk mummies; these and other specimens are now held in the National Museum of Ethnology in Leiden, Netherlands.

The equivalent industry in Europe was the Jenny Haniver made from dried rays.

In the middle of the 17th century, John Tradescant the elder created a wunderkammer (called Tradescant's Ark) in which he displayed, among other things, a "mermaid's hand".

 Mermaid shows 
Scantily clad women placed in watertanks and impersonating mermaids performed at the 1939 New York World's Fair. It was part of the "Dream of Venus" installation by Surrealist artist Salvador Dalí. The mermaid interacted with Oscar the Obscene Octopus, and the ongoings were portrayed in E. L. Doctorow's novel World's Fair.

Professional female divers have performed as mermaids at Florida's Weeki Wachee Springs since 1947. The state park calls itself "The Only City of Live Mermaids" and was extremely popular in the 1960s, drawing almost one million tourists per year. Most of the current performers work part-time while attending college, and all are certified Scuba divers. They wear fabric tails and perform aquatic ballet (while holding their breath) for an audience in an underwater stage with glass walls. Children often ask if the "mermaids" are real. The park's PR director says, "Just like with Santa Claus or any other mythical character, we always say yes. We're not going to tell them they're not real".

The Ama are Japanese skin divers, predominantly women, who traditionally dive for shellfish and seaweed wearing only a loincloth and who have been in action for at least 2,000 years. Starting in the twentieth century, they have increasingly been regarded as a tourist attraction. They operate off reefs near the shore, and some perform for sightseers instead of diving to collect a harvest. They have been romanticized as mermaids.

 Scientific inquiry 
The topic of mermaids in earnest has arisen in several instances of scientific scrutiny, including a biological assessment of the unlikelihood of the supposed evolutionary biology of the mermaid on the popular marine science website DeepSeaNews. Five of the primary reasons listed as to why mermaids do not fit current evolutionary understanding are:
 thermoregulation (adaptations for regulating body heat);
 evolutionary mismatch;
 reproductive challenges;
 digestive differences between mammals and fish;
 lack of physical evidence.

Mermaids were also discussed  in a scientific article by University of Washington emeritus oceanographer Karl Banse. His article was written as a parody, but mistaken as a true scientific exposé by believers as it was published in a scientific journal.

 Myth interpretations 

According to Dorothy Dinnerstein's book The Mermaid and the Minotaur, human-animal hybrids such as mermaids and minotaurs convey the emergent understanding of ancient peoples that humans were both one with and different from animals:

 Arts, entertainment, and media 

[[File:Vanity Fair D467.png|thumb|right|200px|An illustration of Vanity Fair's Becky Sharp as a man-killing mermaid, by the work's author William Thackeray.]]

 Literature 
The best-known example of mermaids in literature is probably Hans Christian Andersen's fairy tale, "The Little Mermaid", first published in 1837. The title character, youngest of the Merman-king's daughters, falls in love with a human prince and also longs for an eternal soul like humans, despite the shorter lifespan. The two cravings are intertwined: only by achieving true love will her soul bind with a human's and become everlasting. But the mermaid's fish-tail poses an insurmountable obstacle for enticing humans, and a sea-witch offers a potion to transform into human form, at a price (the mermaid's tongue and beautiful voice). The mermaid endures the excruciating pain of having human legs, and despite her inability to speak, almost succeeds in wedding the prince, but for a twist of fate. The mermaid is doomed unless she stabs the prince with a magic knife on his wedding night. She refuses to harm him and dies the mermaid way, dissolving into foam. However, her selflessness has earned her a second chance at salvation, and she is resurrected as an air spirit.

Andersen's works has been translated into over 100 languages. One of the main literary influences for Andersen's mermaid was Undine, an earlier German novella about a water nymph who could only obtain an immortal soul by marrying a human. Andersen's heroine inspired a bronze sculpture in Copenhagen harbour and influenced Western literary works such as Oscar Wilde's The Fisherman and His Soul and H.G. Wells' The Sea Lady.

Sue Monk Kidd wrote a book called The Mermaid Chair loosely based on the legends of Saint Senara and the mermaid of Zennor.

 Art and Music 
Sculptures and statues of mermaids can be found in many countries and cultures, with over 130 public art mermaid statues across the world. Countries with public art mermaid sculptures include Russia, Finland, Lithuania, Poland, Romania, Denmark, Norway, England, Scotland, Ireland, Germany, the Netherlands, Belgium, France, Spain, Italy, Austria, Switzerland, Greece, Turkey, India, China, Thailand, South Korea, Japan, Guam, Australia, New Zealand, Brazil, Ecuador, Colombia, Mexico, the Cayman Islands, Mexico, Saudi Arabia (Jeddah), the United States (including Hawaii and the U.S. Virgin Islands) and Canada. Some of these mermaid statues have become icons of their city or country, and are major tourist attractions in themselves. The Little Mermaid statue in Copenhagen is an icon of that city as well as of Denmark. The Havis Amanda statue symbolizes the rebirth of the city of Helsinki. The Syrenka (mermaid) is part of the coat of Arms of Warsaw, and is considered a protector of Warsaw, which publicly displays statues of their mermaid.

An influential image was created by the Pre-Raphaelite painter  John William Waterhouse, from 1895 to 1905, entitled A Mermaid (Cf. figure, top of page). An example of late British Academy-style artwork, the piece debuted to considerable acclaim (and secured Waterhouse's place as a member of the Royal Academy), but disappeared into a private collection and did not resurface until the 1970s. It is currently once again in the Royal Academy's collection. Waterhouse's mermaid grooms her hair with comb and mirror, the stereotypical implements of the mermaid, likely designed to portray her as temptress, and her red hair (auburn hair) is a match for the hair colour of Venus. Waterhouses's The Siren (1900) also depicts the siren as a mermaid of sorts, representing the femme fatale  drawing men to destruction. In the modern age of course, the word "siren" is used as a synonym of femme fatale.

Mermaids were a favorite subject of John Reinhard Weguelin, a contemporary of Waterhouse. He painted an image of the mermaid of Zennor as well as several other depictions of mermaids in watercolour.

Musical depictions of mermaids include those by Felix Mendelssohn in his Fair Melusina overture and the three "Rhine daughters" in Richard Wagner's opera Der Ring des Nibelungen. Lorelei, the name of a Rhine mermaid immortalized in the Heinrich Heine poem of that name, has become a synonym for a siren.  The Weeping Mermaid is an orchestral piece by Taiwanese composer Fan-Long Ko.

 Motion pictures 
Film depictions include Miranda (1948), Night Tide (1961), the romantic comedy Splash (1984), and Aquamarine (2006). A 1963 episode of the television series Route 66 entitled "The Cruelest Sea of All" featured a mermaid performance artist working at Weeki Wachee aquatic park.  Mermaids also appeared in the popular supernatural drama television series Charmed, and were the basis of its spin-off series Mermaid. In She Creature (2001), two carnival workers abduct a mermaid in Ireland c. 1900 and attempt to transport her to America. The film Pirates of the Caribbean: On Stranger Tides mixes old and new myths about mermaids: singing to sailors to lure them to their death, growing legs when taken onto dry land, and bestowing kisses with magical healing properties.

Disney's musical animated version of Andersen's tale, The Little Mermaid, was released in 1989. Notable changes to Andersen's story include removing the religious aspects of the fairy tale, including the mermaid's quest to obtain an immortal soul. The sea-witch herself replaces the princess to whom the prince becomes engaged, using the mermaid's voice to prevent her from obtaining the prince's love. However, on their wedding day the plot is revealed and the sea-witch is vanquished.  The knife motif is not used in the film, which ends with the mermaid and the prince marrying.

Hayao Miyazaki's Ponyo is an animated film about a ningyo who wants to become a human girl with the help of her human friend Sosuke.

The Australian teen dramedy H2O: Just Add Water chronicles the adventures of three modern-day mermaids along the Gold Coast of Australia.

The Starbucks coffee logo is a melusine.

 Heraldry 

In heraldry, the charge of a mermaid is commonly represented with a comb and a mirror, and blazoned as a "mermaid in her vanity". In addition to vanity, mermaids are also a symbol of eloquence.

Mermaids appear with greater frequency as heraldic devices than mermen do. A mermaid appears on the arms of the University of Birmingham, in addition to those of several British families.

A mermaid with two tails is referred to as a melusine. Melusines appear in German heraldry, and less frequently in the British version.

A shield and sword-wielding mermaid (Syrenka'') is on the official coat of arms of Warsaw. Images of a mermaid have symbolized Warsaw on its arms since the middle of the 14th century. Several legends associate Triton of Greek mythology with the city, which may have been the origin of the mermaid's association.

The Cusack family crest includes a mermaid wielding a sword, as depicted on a memorial stone for Sir Thomas Cusack (1490–1571).

The city of Norfolk, Virginia also uses a mermaid as a symbol. The personal coat of arms of Michaëlle Jean, former Governor General of Canada, features two mermaids as supporters.

Fandom 
Interest in mermaid costuming has grown with the popularity of fantasy cosplay, as well as the availability of inexpensive monofins used in the construction of these costumes. The costumes are typically designed to be used while swimming, in an activity known as mermaiding. Mermaid fandom conventions have also been held.

Gallery

See also

Explanatory notes

References

Citations

General and cited references 

 
 
 
 
 
 
 
 Older archived version, with brief synopsis and commentary
 
 : Vol. 2 (J–Z)
 
 
 
 
 
 
 
 
 
 
 Jøn, A. Asbjørn, Dugongs and Mermaids, Selkies and Seals
  (baekur.is) 
 
 
 
  google

External links 

 Becoming Mermaids—American Museum of Natural History

 
Heraldic beasts
Medieval legends
Mythological human hybrids
Nereids
Oceanids
Therianthropy
Water spirits
Fairy tale stock characters